Semon (Sam) Alexandrovich Palatnik (born March 26, 1950) is a Ukrainian-American chess Grandmaster, born in Odessa.

He won four team and individual gold medals at the 20th World Student Team Chess Championship at Teesside 1974, and 21st World Student Team Championship at Caracas 1976.

Some of his tournament results include 2nd= at Kiev 1978, 3rd at Hradec Kralove 1981, 2nd= at Trnava 1987, 1st at Hradec Kralove 1988 and 1st= at Calicut 1988. He currently resides in Tennessee, USA and plays for the U.S. Chess Federation.

Palatnik was awarded the International Master (IM) title in 1977 and the GM title in 1978.

References

1950 births
Living people
Chess grandmasters
Ukrainian chess players
American chess players
Soviet chess players
Sportspeople from Odesa
American people of Ukrainian descent